The list of Japanese municipal flags lists the flags of municipalities of Japan.
Most municipalities of Japan have unique flags. Like prefectural flags, most of them are with a bicolor geometric highly stylized symbol (mon), often incorporating characters from Japanese writing system (kanji, hiragana, katakana, or rōmaji). However, there  are three types of symbols (emblems, logos and crests). Therefore, the list will also discuss the emblems or logos. 
</noinclude>

Complete lists of Japanese municipal flags pages
Because of its size, the list is split into 8 sub pages of regions:

 List of municipal flags of Hokkaidō
 List of municipal flags of Tōhoku region
 List of municipal flags of Kantō region
 List of municipal flags of Chūbu region
 List of municipal flags of Kansai region
 List of municipal flags of Chūgoku region
 List of municipal flags of Shikoku
 List of municipal flags of Kyūshū

Flags of government ordinance cities

See also 
 List of Japanese flags
 Flag of Japan
 Rising Sun Flag

External links 
  市町村旗・章リスト (The list of municipal flags or symbols)
  Municipal flags of Japan by Flags of the World.

Municipal
Japan